El Negrell is a mountain of Catalonia, Spain. It has an elevation of 1,345 metres above sea level.

See also
Mountains of Catalonia

Mountains of Catalonia
Ports de Tortosa-Beseit
Emblematic summits of Catalonia